Al-Urban is a town in northwestern Libya, in the Jabal al Gharbi District. Prior to 2007 it was located at the Gharyan District. It is the home of three tribes: Awlad Al-brek, Gmata, and Jaãfra.

References

See also 
 List of cities in Libya

Populated places in Jabal al Gharbi District
Tripolitania